Bedminster Township may refer to:

 Bedminster Township, New Jersey
 Bedminster Township, Pennsylvania

Township name disambiguation pages